Huang Wenpan (22 August 1995 – 15 March 2018) was a Chinese Paralympic swimmer. He won five gold medals at the 2016 Summer Paralympics: at the Men's 50 metre freestyle S3 event with a world record and paralympic record of 39.24, at the Men's 200 metre freestyle S3 event with a world record and paralympic record of 3:09.04, at the Men's 50 metre breaststroke SB2 event with a world record and paralympic record of 50.65 at the Men's 150 metre individual medley SM3 event with a world record and paralympic record of 2:40.19. and at the Mixed 4 x 50 metre freestyle relay 20pts event with a world record and paralympic record of 2:18.03. He also won a silver medal at the Men's 50 metre backstroke S3 event with 46.11.

Death 
Huang Wenpan died on 16 March 2018 after succumbing to injuries following a car accident where he drove the car alone which crashed into a lamp post.

References

1995 births
2018 deaths
Swimmers at the 2016 Summer Paralympics
Medalists at the 2016 Summer Paralympics
Paralympic gold medalists for China
Paralympic silver medalists for China
Paralympic swimmers of China
Chinese male medley swimmers
Chinese male freestyle swimmers
Chinese male breaststroke swimmers
Chinese male backstroke swimmers
Road incident deaths in the People's Republic of China
People from Meishan
Swimmers from Sichuan
Paralympic medalists in swimming
S3-classified Paralympic swimmers
21st-century Chinese people